Edgewood School District was a public school district serving the families of Edgewood, Allegheny County, Pennsylvania and surrounding communities by providing K-12 public education.  The school opened October 6, 1892 in the town of Edgewood and operated for 90 years before closing.
The Edgewood School District was eliminated by court order in July 1981 when the students of Edgewood were included in the newly formed, larger, Woodland Hills School District.

References

School districts in Allegheny County, Pennsylvania
School districts established in 1892
1892 establishments in Pennsylvania
1982 disestablishments in Pennsylvania
School districts disestablished in 1982